Baisha xiyue (literally "Baisha fine music") is one of the two surviving forms of traditional music of the Naxi (also spelled Nakhi or Nahi) people of Lijiang, Yunnan Province, China, known as "Naxi ancient music". Baisha is a town located ten kilometres north of Lijiang, and was the capital of the independent Naxi kingdom before it was annexed by the Yuan Empire in 1271.

Baisha xiyue is a classical orchestral musical form, with 24 qupai (tunes), played on antique Chinese musical instruments, such as flute, shawm, Chinese lute, and zither. It is derived from the ritual music of Taoist and Confucian ceremonies from the 14th century. Since Lijiang is relatively remote, the music form has survived relatively unchanged since that period. The music is characterised by the "three olds" – old melodies, old instruments and old musicians.
 
The other surviving form of Naxi ancient music is the Han derived dongjing yinyue ("cave scripture music"), which has its roots in Taoist and Buddhist ritual music.  A third form of Naxi ancient music, huangjing yinyue, has not survived. Traditional Naxi music has been described as the living fossil of Chinese music. The city of Lijiang is itself a World Heritage Site.

Chinese folk music
Nakhi people
Music of Yunnan